Nathan Derek Minchey (born August 31, 1969) is a former pitcher in Major League Baseball who played from 1993 through 1997 for the Boston Red Sox (1993–94, 1996) and Colorado Rockies (1997). He also played seven seasons in Japan, from 1998 until 2004, for the Hiroshima Toyo Carp (1998–2000) and Chiba Lotte Marines (2001–2004)

In a three-season career, Minchey posted a 3–7 record with 38 strikeouts and a 6.75 ERA in 15 appearances, including 12 starts, one complete game, and 64.0 innings of work. Following his majors career, Minchey played in Japan for seven seasons. He had a 74–70 record with 626 strikeouts and a 3.64 ERA in 1213⅓ innings, collecting two 15-win seasons and leading the Japanese Pacific League with a 3.26 ERA in 2001.

Minchey also pitched in the Montreal, Atlanta, Boston, St. Louis and Colorado minor league systems from 1987 to 1997. He went 112–104 with 1141 strikeouts and a 3.54 ERA in 1832⅔  innings, and posted identical records of 15–6 in 1992 and 1997. Overall, Minchey collected 189 wins in a span of 16 years. Since 2007, he has worked as a scouting supervisor for the Cleveland Indians in Japanese baseball.

External links

 Nate Minchey at SABR (Baseball BioProject)

Baseball players from Austin, Texas
Major League Baseball pitchers
Boston Red Sox players
Colorado Rockies players
Rockford Expos players
Burlington Braves players
Durham Bulls players
Miami Miracle players
Greenville Braves players
Pawtucket Red Sox players
Louisville Redbirds players
Colorado Springs Sky Sox players
American expatriate baseball players in Japan
Hiroshima Toyo Carp players
Chiba Lotte Marines players
1969 births
Living people